Shulin District is an inner city district in southwestern New Taipei City, Taiwan.

History
On August 1, 1946, seventeen urban villages were divided from Yingge Township and made into Shulin Township.

Shulin was upgraded to a county-administered city of Taipei County on 4 October 1999 from an urban township, and to a district of New Taipei City on 25 December 2010.

Administrative divisions
Shulin District administers forty-two urban villages:
 Sanxing, Sanfu, Sanduo, Sanlong, Qiangliao, Guangxing, Jinliao, Tandi, Wenlin, Baoan, Zunan, Zunfu, Zunmin, Zunsheng, Shude, Shufu, Shuxi, Shuxing, Shuren, Yuying, Shunan, Ponei, Shutung, Shubei, Pengfu, Heping, Pengxing, Pengcuo, Datong, Zhonghua, Taishun, Tungsheng, Tungyang, Tungshan, Shanjia (Shanchia), Zhongshan, Leshan, Ganyuan, Xiyuan, Nanyuan, Tungyuan and Beiyuan Village.

Religion
Baosheng Dadi is the most commonly accepted deity in Shulin District. The most important holiday in Shulin is the birthday of Baosheng Dadi, which falls on the fifteenth day of the third month of the Chinese lunar calendar.

The people of Ganyuan celebrate a festival for Baoyi daifu (保儀大夫) on the first day of the ninth month of the lunar calendar.

A hog is sacrificed every year on the sixth day of the first month of the lunar calendar.

Tourist Attractions
 Datong Mountain
 Lujiao Creek Wetlands

Infrastructures
 Shulin Refuse Incineration Plant

Transportation

 TRA Shanjia Station
 TRA Shulin Station

Notable natives
 Sung Yu-chi, Taekwondo athlete

See also
 New Taipei City

References

External links

  
 107年樹林區施政成果影片 ('2018 Shulin District Government Work Video') 

Districts of New Taipei